Robert and Bertram (German: Robert und Bertram) may refer to:

 Robert and Bertram (ballet), an 1841 ballet of composers Cesare Pugni and Johann Schmidt
 Robert and Bertram (play), an 1856 play by Gustav Räder
 Robert and Bertram (opera), an 1888 opera by Kazimierz Hofman
 Robert and Bertram (1915 film), a silent German film adaptation directed by Max Mack
 Robert and Bertram (1928 film), a silent German film adaptation directed by Rudolf Walther-Fein
 Robert and Bertram (1938 film), a Polish film adaptation directed by Mieczysław Krawicz
 Robert and Bertram (1939 film), a German film adaptation directed by Hans H. Zerlett
 Robert and Bertram (1961 film), a German film adaptation directed by Hans Deppe